The following outline is provided as an overview of and a topical guide to the Church of Jesus Christ of Latter-day Saints.

The Church of Jesus Christ of Latter-day Saints (LDS Church or, informally, the Mormon Church) is a Christian restorationist church that is considered by its followers to be the restoration of the original church founded by Jesus Christ. The church is headquartered in Salt Lake City, Utah, and has established congregations (called wards or branches) and built temples worldwide. It is the largest denomination in the Latter Day Saint movement founded by Joseph Smith during the period of religious revival known as the Second Great Awakening.

Nature of the church 

The LDS Church can be described as all of the following:
 Belief system –
 Religion –
 Abrahamic religion –
Christianity –
Restorationism –
Latter Day Saint movement –
List of sects in the Latter Day Saint movement –

Beliefs
 Beliefs and practices of the Church of Jesus Christ of Latter-day Saints
 Restoration (Latter Day Saints)
 Priesthood (LDS Church)
 Aaronic priesthood (Latter Day Saints)
 Melchizedek priesthood (Latter Day Saints)
 Standard Works
 God in Mormonism
 Mormon cosmology
 King Follett discourse
 Plan of salvation (Latter Day Saints)
 Degrees of glory
 Spirit world (Latter Day Saints)
 Revelation (Latter Day Saints)
 Ordinance (Latter Day Saints)
 Covenant (Latter Day Saints)
 Temple (LDS Church)
 Exaltation (Mormonism)
 Baptism for the dead

Salvation diagram

Social principles

Gender
 Celestial marriage
 Mormonism and women
 Ordain Women
 Gender minorities and the Church of Jesus Christ of Latter-day Saints

Sexuality
 Sexuality and Mormonism
 Law of chastity
 Views on masturbation in the Church of Jesus Christ of Latter-day Saints
 Homosexuality and the Church of Jesus Christ of Latter-day Saints
 Timeline of LGBT Mormon history
 LGBT Mormon people and organizations

Race
Black people and Mormonism
Black people and Mormon priesthood
1978 Revelation on Priesthood
Black people and early Mormonism
Mormonism and slavery
Interracial marriage and the Church of Jesus Christ of Latter-day Saints
Mormonism and Pacific Islanders
Lamanites
House of Joseph (LDS Church)

Laws related to Race
Act for the relief of Indian Slaves and Prisoners
Act in Relation to Service
Indian Placement Program

Events related to Race
Battle at Fort Utah
Battle Creek massacre
Bear River Massacre
Black Hawk War (1865–1872)
Bluff War
Fountain Green massacre
Salt Creek Canyon massacre
Ute Wars

Duties
 Mormonism and authority
 Strengthening Church Members Committee
 Law of consecration
 Tithing (Latter Day Saints)
 Endowment (Mormonism)
 Temple garment
 Calling (LDS Church)
 Family Home Evening
 Word of Wisdom
 Missionary (LDS Church)

Ordinance 
Main article
Ordinance (Latter Day Saints)
Purpose
Exaltation (Mormonism)
List of ordinances
Baptism in Mormonism
Rebaptism (Mormonism)
Confirmation (Latter Day Saints)
Baptism with the Holy Spirit
Priesthood (Latter Day Saints)
Endowment (Latter Day Saints)
Endowment (Mormonism)
Sealing (Mormonism)
Washing and anointing
Celestial marriage
Law of adoption (Mormonism)
Second anointing
Baptism for the dead
Chrism
Right hand of Christian fellowship
Hosanna shout
Naming and blessing of children
Patriarchal blessing
Prayer circle (Mormonism)
Priesthood blessing
Setting apart
Shaking the dust from the feet
Common consent (Latter Day Saints)
Solemn assembly
Sacrament (LDS Church)

History

Early history
 History of the Latter Day Saint movement

New York
 Second Great Awakening
 Burned-over district
 First Vision
 Golden plates
 Church of Christ (Latter Day Saints)

Ohio
 Kirtland, Ohio
 Kirtland Temple
 Sidney Rigdon
 High council (Latter Day Saints)
 School of the Prophets
 Joseph Smith Papyri
 Fanny Alger
 Kirtland Safety Society

Missouri
 Jackson County, Missouri
 Zion (Latter Day Saints)
 Far West, Missouri
 1838 Mormon War
 Thomas B. Marsh
 Liberty Jail

Illinois
 History of Nauvoo, Illinois
 Nauvoo Temple
 University of Nauvoo
 Nauvoo Legion
 Second anointing
 Anointed Quorum
 William Law (Latter Day Saints)
 Nauvoo Expositor
 Death of Joseph Smith
 Succession crisis (Latter Day Saints)

Pioneer Era
 History of the Church of Jesus Christ of Latter-day Saints

Utah
 Mormon pioneers
 Mormon Trail
 History of Utah
 Salt Lake City
 Council of Fifty
 Theodemocracy
 State of Deseret
 Utah Territory
 Mormon Reformation
 Jedediah M. Grant
 Heber C. Kimball
 Blood atonement
 Utah War
 Mountain Meadows massacre
 Alfred Cumming
 James Buchanan
 United Order
 Mormonism and polygamy

Modern Times
 Wilford Woodruff
 1890 Manifesto
 Joseph F. Smith
 Second Manifesto
 Spencer W. Kimball
 1978 Revelation on Priesthood
 Good Neighbor policy (LDS Church)
 DezNat

By century
 19th century
 20th century
 21st century

Culture
 Culture of the Church of Jesus Christ of Latter-day Saints

Education
Church Educational System
Brigham Young University 
 Jerusalem Center 
BYU–Idaho
BYU–Hawaii
Ensign College
Sunday School
Institute of Religion
Perpetual Education Fund

Family history
Genealogical Society of Utah
Sealing
Family History Centers
FamilySearch
Granite Mountain

Music
 Mormon music
 Mormon Tabernacle Choir
 Orchestra at Temple Square
 Bells on Temple Square
 Temple Square Chorale
 Hymns of the Church of Jesus Christ of Latter-day Saints
 Hymns in the Church of Jesus Christ of Latter-day Saints

Cinema 

 Mormon cinema

Mormon studies 
 Mormon studies
Association for Mormon Letters
Church Historian and Recorder
FairMormon
John Whitmer Historical Association
Mormon Historic Sites Foundation
Mormon History Association
Neal A. Maxwell Institute for Religious Scholarship
Sunstone (magazine)

Journals and Literature
History of the Church (Joseph Smith)
The Joseph Smith Papers
Journal of Discourses
Encyclopedia of Mormonism
Mormonism: A Historical Encyclopedia
BYU Studies Quarterly
Dialogue (journal)
James McLachlan (scholar)
Woman's Exponent
International Journal of Mormon Studies
Interpreter (journal)
Journal of Book of Mormon Studies
Mormon Studies Review
Utah State Historical Society

Mormonism and polygamy 

Main article
Mormonism and polygamy
Background
Origin of Latter Day Saint polygamy
Latter Day Saint polygamy in the late-19th century
1890 Manifesto
Second Manifesto
Council of Friends (Woolley)
1886 Revelation
Current state
Current state of polygamy in the Latter Day Saint movement
Mormon fundamentalism
Fundamentalist Church of Jesus Christ of Latter-Day Saints
Apostolic United Brethren
Related laws
Morrill Anti-Bigamy Act
Poland Act
Edmunds Act
Edmunds–Tucker Act
Reed Smoot hearings
Related case laws
Reynolds v. United States
Angus M. Cannon
Clawson v. United States
Davis v. Beason
Late Corp. of the Church of Jesus Christ of Latter-Day Saints v. United States
Cleveland v. United States (1946)
Brown v. Buhman
Related articles
Celestial marriage
Spiritual wifery
Polygamy in North America
Mormon colonies in Mexico
Latter-day Saint settlements in Canada
Short Creek raid
Lost boys (Mormon fundamentalism)
YFZ Ranch
Polygamy czar
Legal status of polygamy
In media
Big Love
Sister Wives
Sons of Perdition (film)
Under the Banner of Heaven
Lists
List of Joseph Smith's wives
List of Brigham Young's wives
List of Latter Day Saint practitioners of plural marriage
List of Mormon fundamentalist leaders
List of polygamy court cases

Brigham Young University 
Main article
Brigham Young University
Related
History of Brigham Young University
Academic freedom at Brigham Young University
Campus of Brigham Young University
List of Brigham Young University buildings
Sister schools
Brigham Young University–Hawaii
List of presidents of Brigham Young University–Hawaii
BYU–Hawaii Seasiders
List of Brigham Young University–Hawaii alumni
Brigham Young University–Idaho
List of presidents of Brigham Young University–Idaho
List of Brigham Young University–Idaho alumni
Colleges
David O. McKay School of Education
Ira A. Fulton College of Engineering and Technology
BYU College of Family, Home and Social Sciences
BYU College of Fine Arts and Communications
BYU College of Humanities
J. Reuben Clark Law School
BYU College of Life Sciences
Marriott School of Management
BYU College of Nursing
BYU College of Physical and Mathematical Sciences
BYU Religious Education
Academics
Harold B. Lee Library
Ernest L. Wilkinson Student Center
Eyring Science Center
Franklin S. Harris Fine Arts Center
Gordon B. Hinckley Alumni and Visitors Center
BYU Testing Center
Jesse Knight Building
Joseph Smith Building
Maeser Building
N. Eldon Tanner Building
Spencer W. Kimball Tower
Museums
Brigham Young University Museum of Art
Brigham Young University Museum of Peoples and Cultures
BYU Museum of Paleontology
Monte L. Bean Life Science Museum
Student life
Student life at Brigham Young University
Church Educational System Honor Code
BYU Ballroom Dance Company
Brigham Young University Centennial Carillon Tower
BYU Cougars
Media
BYUtv
BYU Television International
Lists
List of Brigham Young University alumni
List of Brigham Young University faculty
List of presidents of Brigham Young University

List of LDS Church Temples  

Chronological list
Dedicated in 19th Century

Prior to the succession crisis 
Kirtland Temple
Nauvoo Temple

St George Utah Temple
St. George Utah Temple

Logan Utah Temple
Logan Utah Temple

Manti Utah Temple
Manti Utah Temple

Salt Lake Temple
Salt Lake Temple

 Dedicated in early 20th Century 
Laie Hawaii Temple
Laie Hawaii Temple

Cardston Alberta Temple
Mesa Arizona Temple
Idaho Falls Idaho Temple

 Dedicated in 1950s & 60s
Bern Switzerland Temple
Los Angeles California Temple
Hamilton New Zealand Temple
London England Temple
Oakland California Temple

 Dedicated in 1970s
Ogden Utah Temple
Provo Utah Temple
Washington D.C. Temple
São Paulo Brazil Temple

 Dedicated in 1980s - Traditional Designs
Tokyo Japan Temple
Seattle Washington Temple
Jordan River Utah Temple
Atlanta Georgia Temple
Mexico City Mexico Temple
Portland Oregon Temple

 Dedicated in 1980s - Smaller Temple Designs
Apia Samoa Temple
Nuku'alofa Tonga Temple
Santiago Chile Temple
Papeete Tahiti Temple
Boise Idaho Temple
Sydney Australia Temple
Manila Philippines Temple
Dallas Texas Temple
Taipei Taiwan Temple
Guatemala City Guatemala Temple
Freiberg Germany Temple
Stockholm Sweden Temple
Chicago Illinois Temple
Johannesburg South Africa Temple
Seoul Korea Temple
Lima Peru Temple
Buenos Aires Argentina Temple
Denver Colorado Temple
Frankfurt Germany Temple
Las Vegas Nevada Temple

 Dedicated in 1990s - Traditional Designs
Toronto Ontario Temple
San Diego California Temple
Orlando Florida Temple
Bountiful Utah Temple
Hong Kong China Temple
Mount Timpanogos Utah Temple
St. Louis Missouri Temple
Vernal Utah Temple
Preston England Temple
Madrid Spain Temple
Bogotá Colombia Temple
Guayaquil Ecuador Temple
Billings Montana Temple

 Dedicated in 1990s - New Small Temple Designs
Monticello Utah Temple
Anchorage Alaska Temple
Colonia Juárez Chihuahua Mexico Temple
Spokane Washington Temple
Columbus Ohio Temple
Bismarck North Dakota Temple
Columbia South Carolina Temple
Detroit Michigan Temple
Halifax Nova Scotia Temple
Regina Saskatchewan Temple
Edmonton Alberta Temple
Raleigh North Carolina Temple

 Dedicated in 2000 - Traditional Designs
Albuquerque New Mexico Temple
Cochabamba Bolivia Temple
Houston Texas Temple
Santo Domingo Dominican Republic Temple
Boston Massachusetts Temple
Recife Brazil Temple

 Dedicated in 2000 - New Small Temple Designs
St. Paul Minnesota Temple
Kona Hawaii Temple
Ciudad Juárez Mexico Temple
Hermosillo Sonora Mexico Temple
Oaxaca Mexico Temple
Tuxtla Gutiérrez Mexico Temple
Louisville Kentucky Temple
Palmyra New York Temple
Fresno California Temple
Medford Oregon Temple
Memphis Tennessee Temple
Reno Nevada Temple
Tampico Mexico Temple
Nashville Tennessee Temple
Villahermosa Mexico Temple
Montreal Quebec Temple
San José Costa Rica Temple
Fukuoka Japan Temple
Adelaide Australia Temple
Melbourne Australia Temple
Suva Fiji Temple
Mérida Mexico Temple
Veracruz Mexico Temple
Baton Rouge Louisiana Temple
Oklahoma City Oklahoma Temple
Caracas Venezuela Temple
Birmingham Alabama Temple
Porto Alegre Brazil Temple

 Dedicated 2001-2009 - Traditional Designs
Campinas Brazil Temple
Nauvoo Illinois Temple
Copenhagen Denmark Temple
Manhattan New York Temple
Sacramento California Temple
Helsinki Finland Temple
Rexburg Idaho Temple
Curitiba Brazil Temple
Twin Falls Idaho Temple
Draper Utah Temple
Oquirrh Mountain Utah Temple

Dedicated 2001-2009 - New Small Temple Designs
Montevideo Uruguay Temple
Winter Quarters Nebraska Temple
Guadalajara Mexico Temple
Perth Australia Temple
Columbia River Washington Temple
Snowflake Arizona Temple
Lubbock Texas Temple
Monterrey Mexico Temple
Asunción Paraguay Temple
The Hague Netherlands Temple
Brisbane Australia Temple
Redlands California Temple
Accra Ghana Temple
San Antonio Texas Temple
Aba Nigeria Temple
Newport Beach California Temple
Panama City Panama Temple

Dedicated in 2010s
Vancouver British Columbia Temple
Gila Valley Arizona Temple
Cebu City Philippines Temple
Kyiv Ukraine Temple
San Salvador El Salvador Temple
Quetzaltenango Guatemala Temple
Kansas City Missouri Temple
Manaus Brazil Temple
Brigham City Utah Temple
Calgary Alberta Temple
Tegucigalpa Honduras Temple
Gilbert Arizona Temple
Fort Lauderdale Florida Temple
Phoenix Arizona Temple
Córdoba Argentina Temple
Payson Utah Temple
Trujillo Peru Temple
Indianapolis Indiana Temple
Tijuana Mexico Temple
Provo City Center Temple

Dedicated in 2020s
Rome Italy Temple
Philadelphia Pennsylvania Temple
Sapporo Japan Temple
Fortaleza Brazil Temple
Hartford Connecticut Temple
Fort Collins Colorado Temple
Paris France Temple
Meridian Idaho Temple
Star Valley Wyoming Temple
Cedar City Utah Temple
Concepción Chile Temple
Tucson Arizona Temple
Lisbon Portugal Temple
Urdaneta Philippines Temple
Winnipeg Manitoba Temple
Barranquilla Colombia Temple
Durban South Africa Temple
Arequipa Peru Temple
Rio de Janeiro Brazil Temple
Abidjan Ivory Coast Temple
Bangkok Thailand Temple
Port-au-Prince Haiti Temple
Harare Zimbabwe Temple
Quito Ecuador Temple
Belém Brazil Temple
Lima Peru Los Olivos Temple

Institutions of the LDS Church

Priesthood 
Main article
Priesthood (LDS Church)
Divisions
Melchizedek priesthood (Latter Day Saints)
Aaronic priesthood (Latter Day Saints)
Aaronic priesthood
Deacon (Latter Day Saints)
Teacher (Latter Day Saints)
Priest (Latter Day Saints)
Bishop (Latter Day Saints)
Melchizedek priesthood
Elder (Latter Day Saints)
Seventy (LDS Church)
High priest (Latter Day Saints)
Patriarch (Latter Day Saints)
Apostle (Latter Day Saints)
Quorums
Quorum (Latter Day Saints)
First Presidency (LDS Church)
Quorum of the Twelve Apostles (LDS Church)
Presiding Bishop (LDS Church)
Council on the Disposition of the Tithes
Common Council of the Church
Council of the Church
High council (Latter Day Saints)
Disciplinary council
Callings
President of the Church (LDS Church)
President of the Quorum of the Twelve Apostles (LDS Church)
Acting President of the Quorum of the Twelve Apostles
Prophet, seer, and revelator
General authority
Temple president
Mission president
Stake (Latter Day Saints)
Church Historian and Recorder
Branch president
Defunct Callings
Assistant President of the Church
Assistant to the Quorum of the Twelve Apostles
Council of Fifty
Regional representative of the Twelve
Presiding Patriarch

Headquarters 

 Temple Square (Salt Lake Temple)
 Tabernacle
 Tabernacle Organ
 Assembly Hall
 Gardens
 Conference Center (Organ)
 Church Office Building
 Joseph Smith Memorial Building
 Church Administration Building
 Relief Society Building
 Brigham Young Complex (Beehive House
 Lion House)
 Family History Library
 Church History Museum
 Church History Library

Historic sites

Hierarchy of leadership

Organization
 Organization (LDS Church)
 Primary (LDS Church)
 Relief Society
 Sunday School (LDS Church)
 Young Men (organization)
 Young Women (organization)

Geographical divisions

 Area
 Mission (List of)
 District
 Ward
 Branch

By country

In the USA

Texts and scriptures
 Standard works

Key scripture
 Bible: King James Version, Joseph Smith Translation
 Book of Mormon
Small Plates of Nephi
First Book of Nephi
Second Book of Nephi
Book of Jacob
Book of Enos
Book of Jarom
Book of Omni
Words of Mormon
Mormon's abridgment of  the Large Plates of Nephi
Book of Mosiah
Book of Alma
Book of Helaman
Third Nephi
Fourth Nephi
Book of Mormon
Book of Ether
Book of Moroni
 Doctrine and Covenants
 Pearl of Great Price
 Book of Moses
 Book of Abraham
 Book of Joseph
 Joseph Smith–Matthew
 Joseph Smith–History
 Articles of Faith

Other texts
 History of the Church
 Journal of Discourses

Important figures

LDS Church Presidents 
Overview
The Church of Jesus Christ of Latter-day Saints
List of presidents of the Church of Jesus Christ of Latter-day Saints
President of the Church (LDS Church)
Prophet, seer, and revelator
President of the Quorum of the Twelve Apostles (LDS Church)
Teachings of Presidents of the Church
Salt Lake Temple
Holy of Holies (LDS Church)
Chronological List
Joseph Smith
Brigham Young
John Taylor (Mormon)
Wilford Woodruff
Lorenzo Snow
Joseph F. Smith
Heber J. Grant
George Albert Smith
David O. McKay
Joseph Fielding Smith
Harold B. Lee
Spencer W. Kimball
Ezra Taft Benson
Howard W. Hunter
Gordon B. Hinckley
Thomas S. Monson
Russell M. Nelson

Central figures
 Joseph Smith
 Teachings of Joseph Smith
 Brigham Young
 List of presidents of the Church of Jesus Christ of Latter-day Saints
 Teachings of Presidents of the Church

LDS Church apostles
 Quorum of the Twelve Apostles
 Chronology of the Quorum of the Twelve Apostles
 List of members of the Quorum of the Twelve Apostles

Other influential figures
 Book of Mormon witnesses
 Three Witnesses
 Eight Witnesses
 Mary Whitmer

Groups
 Mormons
 Cultural Mormon
 Molly Mormon and Peter Priesthood
 Less-active Mormon
 Jack Mormon
 Ex-Mormon
 Anti-Mormon

Notable individuals
 List of Latter Day Saints

Template of the LDS Church

Position of the LDS Church within the Mormon movement

Comparison with the Community of Christ 

Main article
Community of Christ
Sacred Texts
Joseph Smith Translation of the Bible
Book of Mormon
Doctrine and Covenants
History
History of the Community of Christ
Amboy Conference
Kirtland Temple Suit
Temple Lot Case
Comparison of the Community of Christ and the Church of Jesus Christ of Latter-day Saints
John Whitmer Historical Association
Worship Services
Priesthood (Community of Christ)
Independence Temple
Kirtland Temple
Auditorium (Community of Christ)
World Conference (Community of Christ)
Sacrament (Community of Christ)
Daily Prayer for Peace
Hymns of the Saints
Community of Christ Seminary
Community of Christ membership and field organization
Community of Christ International Peace Award
Publication Service
Herald (Community of Christ)
Herald House
Harvest Hills Cooperative Community
Organisation
Lineal succession (Latter Day Saints)
President of the Church
First Presidency (Community of Christ)
Council of Twelve Apostles (Community of Christ)
World Church Leadership Council
Standing High Council
List of Presidents
List of Prophet-Presidents of the Community of Christ
Joseph Smith III
Frederick M. Smith
Israel A. Smith
W. Wallace Smith
Wallace B. Smith
W. Grant McMurray
Stephen M. Veazey
Controversies
GALA (Gay and Lesbian Acceptance)
Supreme directional control

See also

Index of articles related to the Church of Jesus Christ of Latter-day Saints
Outline of the Book of Mormon
Outline of Joseph Smith

References

External links 

 Saints Unscripted

 1
The Church of Jesus Christ of Latter-day Saints
The Church of Jesus Christ of Latter-day Saints